The Scots College was a college of the University of Paris, France, founded by an Act of the Parliament of Paris on 8 July 1333. The act was a ratification of an event that had already taken place, the founding of the Collegium Scoticum, one of a number of national colleges into which the University was divided. The Scots College came to an end in 1793 when the National Convention abolished the colleges and reorganized the University along different lines.

Early history

At some time not long before 1323 King Robert the Bruce of Scotland sent an embassy including the Earl of Moray and his kinsman David de Moravia (1299–1326), the Bishop of Moray, "to conclude a treaty of 'confederacy' " renewing the auld alliance between Scotland and France. A passionate benefactor of religious learning, the Bishop in 1325 endowed the lands of Grisy-Suisnes, just outside Paris to be used as a source of funds for students from his parish studying at the University of Paris. The Collegium Scoticum came into existence in 1325 and its foundation was confirmed by Charles le Bel, King of France, in August 1326.

The College accepted both lay and clerical students. In 1707, the minimum age for admission was fixed at fifteen, but that was often ignored. It competed with the Jesuit college to attract good students.

Scottish Catholic refuge
When the Roman Catholic Church was disestablished in Scotland, the Scots College became a centre for Catholic Scots abroad and a political centre for persons who hoped to reconvert Scotland. Mary, Queen of Scots, contributed to it even from prison. Meanwhile, the college buildings at Rue des Fosses de S. Victor became a repository for many valuable Scottish state documents.

James Beaton bequeathed his property, including the archives of the Diocese of Glasgow, and a great mass of important correspondence, to the Scots College. Some of these documents had already been deposited by him in the Carthusian monastery in Paris.

Efforts to reconvert Scotland militarily and politically failed. Neither James VI & I nor his son Charles I were inclined to change religions, but the restored monarch, Charles II converted on his deathbed and his successor, his brother, James II, was a Catholic. The Protestant English found it necessary to depose him in favour of his Protestant daughter, (alternatively he abandoned his throne, and the Convention Parliament invited) Queen Mary II, and the college once more became a centre for exiled Scottish Catholics. 

In the last political movement of any significance raised by the Scottish Catholics, the college became a rallying point for the supporters of Prince Charles Edward Stuart (Bonnie Prince Charlie).

French Revolution
During the French Revolution the people of Paris paid little respect to either Catholicism or Protestantism. Social transformation had changed paradigms entirely. The Scots College, seen as an aristocratic institution, was sacked in 1792 and many of its valuable documents were destroyed.

The building was taken for use as a prison during the Reign of Terror. Among its famous prisoners, Louis de Saint-Just was briefly imprisoned here during the revolt of Thermidor. He was rescued (equally briefly) by forces under François Hanriot before he was recaptured and executed at the guillotine.

Modern mementos

One of its chapels had a bronze urn containing the brain of King James VII. After he died of a brain hemorrhage on 16 September 1701 at Saint-Germain-en-Laye his body was laid in a coffin at the Chapel of Saint Edmund in the Church of the English Benedictines in the Rue St. Jacques. However, during the French Revolution, his body was desecrated and the other remains were lost.

Notable alumni
Robert Barclay
George Buchanan
James Drummond, 2nd Duke of Perth
Thomas Innes
Alexander Macdonell

See also
Auld Alliance
Scots College, Douai
Collège des Écossais, Montpellier
Scots College (disambiguation)

Notes

Bibliography

See also
 Irish College in Paris
 Scots College Rome
 Royal Scots College, Salamanca, Spain

Colleges of the University of Paris
1333 establishments in Europe
1330s establishments in France